Phyllodesma japonica is a moth belonging to the family Lasiocampidae. The species was first described by John Henry Leech in 1889.

It is native to Eurasia.

References

Lasiocampidae
Moths described in 1889